Sekondi College is a co-educational second cycle school in Sekondi in the Western Region of Ghana. It has a science and computer laboratories and other facilities.

Notable staff
One of its staff, S. K. Riley-Poku, who was headmaster of the school between 1966 and 1969 later became the Minister for Defence in the Limann government between 1979 and 1981.

Notable alumni

Anthony Benin - active justice of the Supreme Court of Ghana (2012–)
Nana Ato Dadzie - Chief of Staff of Ghana Jerry Rawlings Administration (1997 – 2001)
Prof Kwabena Frimpong-Boateng - first black person to perform open heart surgery
Kofi Koduah Sarpong - Ghanaian administrator and CEO of Ghana National Petroleum Corporation

References

Schools in Ghana
Sekondi-Takoradi
Education in the Western Region (Ghana)